Mega-merger is a distributed algorithm aimed at solving the election problem in generic connected undirected graph.

Introduction 
Mega-Merger was developed by Robert Gray Gallager at MIT in 1983. It applies a distributed divide and conquer approach mixed with a rank-based conquer strategy. The algorithm is usually presented through a village-city analogy. Each node in the graph indicates a village, while the edges that connect them are the roads and a rooted spanning tree in a sub-graph is a city. The whole graph is then a mega-city. Mega-Merger pushes villages to bind together to form cities according to each other's rank and edges. Cities are then formed by alliances or by conquering/absorption.

Pre-requisites 
Mega-Merger builds a minimum spanning tree over connected graphs provided:

 Total reliability: No message is lost in transmission.
 UI (unique initiator): A single node starts the protocol.
 Bi-directional communications channels: Each edge is bi-directional, communications can travel in both directions.
No further restrictions are necessary.

Algorithm 
The algorithm assigns to each village a name and a rank, the former usually unique. The latter states the number of friendly mergers that the city has gone through, and the larger it is, the more powerful a city is considered. Moreover, to each edge is assigned a weight: each village/city  has a minimum-weight edge  also called merge link, that is the edge whose traversal has minimum cost.

The algorithm proceeds in consecutive stages until a mega-city is formed. Each city C computes its own merge link and sends a request for merging across .
 Friendly merge: : If the cities share the same merge link and have same rank, a friendly merge occurs, and the two cities merge into one. A new name is picked for the newly created city, a ruling village is picked and the path from the previous ruler to the node in the merge link is re-oriented such that it leads to the new leader. The new city also has its rank increased by one. Notice as this is the only way two cities can increase each other's rank. 

Outside messages 
No nodes in the graph have a list of villages belonging to their village, hence each time a city wants to look for edges leading outside of it, it has to adopt an ask-reply protocol. The city ruler sends a broadcast message through its spanning tree, and each node  receiving it sends requests to its neighbors, excluding the edges to its child(ren) and parent. The response protocol is as follows:
 :  is asking to a city of higher rank. By rule 2 we can assert that no absorption occurs, and  indeed belongs to another city.
 : in this case  will delay the answer as by rule 3.

Properties 
Mega-Merger holds several properties:
 Monotonic rank: Each city , mega-city excluded, will eventually rise in rank.
 : we have a level increase each time a friendly merge is operated. On the inductive case, two cities  operate a friendly merge, hence  by inductive hypothesis.
 : by the previous rule cities are built up on an exponential base , hence the inverse .
 Deadlock prevention: Mega-Merger doesn't incur in any deadlock. Trivially in such case the two merge links would coincide and  would be forced into absorption by rule 2.

Termination 
Termination is granted by deadlock prevention and total reliability.

Cost 
The cost analysis has two components, the stage-cost and the stage upper-bound. A city  enacts a stage by requesting a merge link from its villages and applying one of the above rules according to the desired situation. We can divide this stage in five steps:
 Broadcast request for merge link to the  nodes in the tree.
 Each node forwards an  message to its  neighbors and waits for their  answers.
 The nodes then send the answers back to the city ruler by convergecast for a total of  messages.
 The root then decides on a merge link and sends a message to the elected node. Trivially this message will need to travel  nodes.

Now for the number of stages. Since cities can merge/be absorbed only once per stage, we have a total of total messages.

Correctness 
Mega-Merger creates a minimum spanning tree by merging sub-trees through the minimum cost path, i.e. the merge link. By definition of minimum spanning tree, a minimum spanning tree is a set of minimum spanning trees connected through minimum-cost paths. By construction Mega-Merger forwards a request through its merge-link, and that sooner or later that edge is going to be part of the tree by deadlock prevention.

References 

Distributed algorithms
Distributed computing